Li Qiang (born November 1955) is a former Chinese politician from Jiangsu province. He served as Mayor of Yancheng and the Communist Party Secretary of the coastal city of Lianyungang, both located in Jiangsu province, before being investigated for suspected corruption in September 2014. He was a delegate to the  11th National People's Congress.

Biography
Li was born and raised in Shuyang County, Suqian, Jiangsu. Li graduated from Southeast University in 1997, majoring in business administration.

He became involved in politics in December 1970 and joined the Communist Party of China in August 1975.

Beginning in 1970, he served in several posts in Jiangsu Military District, including soldier, platoon leader, and staff. In March 1981 he was transferred to Nanjing Military Region, he worked there until September 1988.

From December 1996 to December 2000, he served as Chief Executive and Deputy CPC Party Chief of Baixia District. He became the Chief Executive of Jianye District in December 2000, he was re-elected in July 2003.

He became Vice-Mayor of Yancheng in December 2005, and was promoted to Mayor and Deputy Party Secretary in January 2007. In September 2011, he was appointed Party Secretary of Lianyungang City.

On September 17, 2014, he was taken away and detained by officers from the Central Commission for Discipline Inspection for investigation immediately following a meeting that he chaired. He was the first prefectural-level party secretary from Jiangsu to be detained following the 18th Party Congress in 2012.

References

1955 births
Living people
People's Republic of China politicians from Jiangsu
People from Shuyang County
Political office-holders in Jiangsu
Southeast University alumni
Politicians from Suqian
Delegates to the 11th National People's Congress